Ferris State University (FSU or Ferris) is a public university with its main campus in Big Rapids, Michigan. It was founded in 1884 and became a public institution in 1950. Ferris is the ninth-largest institutions of higher education by enrollment in the State of Michigan with over 10,000 students studying on its main campus, at one of the 19 off-campus locations across the state, or online. Two- and four-year degrees are offered through eight academic colleges and graduate degrees from six. Ferris grants professional doctoral degrees via its optometry and pharmacy colleges and a multidisciplinary doctorate of education in community college leadership.

The Ferris State Bulldogs competes in the NCAA Division II Great Lakes Intercollegiate Athletic Conference in all sports except men's ice hockey, in which the team is part of the NCAA Division I Central Collegiate Hockey Association.

History 

Big Rapids Industrial School, as it was originally named, opened on September 1, 1884, in temporary quarters in the Vandersluis Block (present location of J.C. Penney Co.) in Big Rapids. The goal of the school was to provide students with marketable skills for a changing society. By the beginning of the next semester in January 1885 the school changed its name to Ferris Industrial School. In January 1894, the School moved into and dedicated its new building, Old Main, on the corner of Oak and Ives Streets. At this same time, the school was incorporated with capital stock of $50,000.

In 1898, the institution was again renamed to Ferris Institute. In 1900, W. N. Ferris sold capital stock in Ferris Institute to the public, keeping a controlling interest in his own hands. It remained privately owned until August 25, 1931, when the Board of Incorporators, a group of 39 businessmen, purchased Ferris Institute from the old stockholders and selected a board of trustees from their number to govern the school.

In February 1943, alumnus Colin Smith introduced a bill in the legislature for the state to purchase Ferris Institute. It passed both houses but was vetoed by Governor Harry Kelly. Six years later on May 17, 1949, Governor G. Mennen Williams signed the bill accepting Ferris Institute as a gift to the State of Michigan, which took over its governance on July 1, 1950. But before the state took control, fire destroyed the Old Main and the Old Pharmacy Buildings on February 21, 1950. Only the Alumni Building and some minor buildings were left standing. Immediate rebuilding of the Institute began and on July 1, 1963, it was again renamed, this time as Ferris State College.

In November 1987, the institution became Ferris State University. When Ferris became a state college in the fall of 1950, it had consisted entirely of one permanent structure, the Alumni Building, and some surplus Army barracks. By contrast, current enrollment is more than 10,000, and the  campus contains 115 buildings, including educational, administrative, maintenance, student activity and residence hall facilities.

Academics

Admissions 

Ferris State University is considered "less selective" by U.S. News & World Report. For the Class of 2025 (enrolling Fall 2021), Ferris State University received 10,480 applications and accepted 8,884 (84.8%), with 1,405 enrolling. The middle 50% range of SAT scores for enrolling freshmen was 910-1050. The middle 50% ACT composite score range was 19-26.

Academic colleges

The university has 8 colleges offering more than 170 educational programs—Arts and Sciences, Business, Education and Human Services, Engineering Technology, Health Professions, the Kendall College of Art and Design, Michigan College of Optometry, and Pharmacy. Program offerings lead to bachelor's and associate degrees and certificates. Master's degrees in Information Security and Intelligence, Career and Technical Education, Criminal Justice, Business Administration, Curriculum and Instruction, Nursing, and Fine Arts are available. Ferris also offers doctoral degrees in Optometry, Pharmacy, Nursing Practice, and Community College Leadership.

Kendall College of Art and Design offers graduate and undergraduate fine arts degrees as well as a B.S. degree in Art History. Kendall's campus is in Grand Rapids, Michigan.

The Michigan College of Optometry is one of 16 schools or colleges of optometry in the United States and the only college of optometry in Michigan. MCO doctors and student interns deliver eye-care to patients in the region. Graduates receive a Doctor of Optometry degree.

The College of Pharmacy graduates comprise more than half of Michigan's practicing pharmacists. Graduates receive a Doctor of Pharmacy degree.

Ferris State's most popular undergraduate majors, by 2021 graduates, were:
Criminal Justice/Police Science (253)
Business Administration and Management (211)
Registered Nursing/Registered Nurse (139)
Animation, Interactive Technology, Video Graphics, and Special Effects (80)
Biology/Biological Sciences (76)
General Studies (63)
Mechanical/Mechanical Engineering Technology/Technician (55)

Academic schools
Within the Colleges there exist some schools of specialized education. These Schools exist to provide focused education for specific careers.

Housed in the College of Education and Human Services, there are three areas of concentration for undergraduate degrees: Corrections, Generalists, and Law Enforcement.

Housed in the College of Education and Human Services. Three bachelor's degree programs in early childhood, elementary, and secondary education in addition to master's degrees with several concentrations.

Housed in the College of Health Professions, the School of Nursing offers BSN and MSN programs.

Honors Program
The Honors Program includes students from every college and school at Ferris except Kendall—students from almost every major participate in the Honors Program. About  of the Honors students major in Pre-Pharm or similar disciplines, but there is a large number of students in the College of Business, College of Health Professions and the College of Engineering Technology. Honors students live in specialized residence halls (mostly in single rooms), take enhanced general education courses, attend cultural events, and complete 15 hours of community service per semester.

Campus
Ferris State University joined the state's Higher Education System in 1950. The campus was all but destroyed by fire the same year. The only building to survive was the Alumni Building, built in 1929, at the north edge of campus. Since the fire, more than 117 buildings have been built on the main campus.

Main campus

The campus begins about four blocks south of the historic central business district. It is bordered on the north by single-family homes built in the early to middle of the twentieth century. North of Perry Street, the university is bordered by strip commercial development. The university is bordered to the south and west by Big Rapids Township. The township is mostly undeveloped and rural.

The main campus is within easy walking distance of downtown Big Rapids with its restaurants, shops, movie theater, art gallery and municipal park. Bicyclists, hikers and in-line skaters have easy access to the White Pine Trail, Michigan's longest "rails to trails" project.

The campus has undergone major changes since 1990. Several new and renovated buildings, reworked roads and parking areas, pedestrian walkways, and greenspace areas have contributed to the changes on campus.

The National Elastomer Center was added in 1998 to house the Plastics Engineering and Rubber Engineering Technology programs.
The FLITE building (FSU Library for Information, Technology and Education), located at the termination of Perry Street, reintroduced the historic front entrance to the university, and defined the adjacent quad at the campus epicenter.
The renovation of the Timme Library to the Timme Center for Student Services consolidated previously scattered student services in one location.
The Granger Center for Construction and HVACR, stimulated redevelopment of the northern part of campus. The building was designed with an open layout that left most of the mechanical components open for viewing by the students as a working lab.
The IRC Connector between the Business School and the Interdisciplinary Resource Center (IRC) created a collaborative meeting and lounge space which is heavily used by students at all hours.
Opening of the new Michigan College of Optometry building in January 2011.
North Hall opened in August 2017. It is a "Freshman Experience" Residence Hall, and features classrooms, study rooms, a lounge, game room, and a kitchen for residents.

Satellite and online locations
In addition to the main campus, Ferris State University has programs offered at 19 off-campus locations including Dowagiac, Grand Rapids, Flint, Lansing, Traverse City, and University Center. Although the main campus of the university is located in a rural setting the satellite locations are all located in larger, more urban communities. Some programs, such as the Doctor of Pharmacy program, are split between locations having students take the first 2 years of study at a campus in one city and the next 2 years at another.  These locations are managed by the division of Extended and International Operations under the heading Ferris Statewide and Online.

Organization

Administrative structure
Ferris State University is governed by a board of trustees which has general supervision of the institution and controls and directs institutional expenditures. Members of the Board serve eight-year, staggered terms as appointed by the Governor with the advice and consent of the State Senate.

The President of the university is appointed by the Board of Trustees as its principal executive officer and serves at its pleasure. The President is an ex-officio member of the Board without the right to vote.

Current leadership
At present, the university is led by its 19th president, Bill Pink, who was inaugurated on June 30, 2022.

Student government
The mission of the Student Government of Ferris State University is to represent student interests in all aspects of campus life as well as maintain open channels of communication between students, faculty, staff, administration, and the Big Rapids community.

The General Assembly of Student Government is composed of two voting bodies; a House of Representatives and a Senate.  Each registered student organization (RSO) in good standing is eligible to hold one seat on the House of Representatives. Senators are elected by the students in their respective academic colleges.

The leadership rests in the Cabinet; president, executive vice president, treasurer, director of finance, and director of internal assessment.

Athletics

The Ferris State Bulldogs are the athletic teams for the university. Ferris State offers an intercollegiate athletic program that includes 14 men's and women's sports at the NCAA Division II level, except for men's ice hockey which competes in NCAA Division I. Ferris State is a member of the Great Lakes Intercollegiate Athletic Conference (GLIAC) in all sports except men's ice hockey, in which the team is part of the Central Collegiate Hockey Association.

Year in and year out, nearly 400 student-athletes have the opportunity to compete for the Bulldogs on a regional and national level for conference titles and NCAA Championships. Ferris' men's club ice hockey won the American Collegiate Hockey Association Division II national title in 1994. In March 2018, the men's basketball team won the NCAA Division II national championship. The football team won back-to-back NCAA Division II national championships in December 2021 and December 2022.

Sports

Student life

Enrollment decline
Ferris State has seen a dramatic drop in enrollment in recent years. In 2013 total enrollment was 14,707. In 2021 total enrollment had dropped to 10,361. Similarly, Big Rapids City population dropped by more than 27% between 2010 and 2020.

Ferris State Torch
The Ferris State Torch is a student run newspaper first published in 1931. It is a weekly publication between 16 and 28 pages in length with a circulation of just under 5,000. The Torch has been completely student governed, with the exception of a faculty adviser and business manager. The Department of Languages and Literature acts as a liaison between the publication and the rest of the university.

Greek life
There are 27 Greek organizations on campus, subdivided into four different groups: Interfraternity Council fraternities, Black Greek Council Fraternities & Sororities, Panhellenic Council Sororities, and Professional Fraternities & Sororities.

Organizations in the Interfraternity Council include: Alpha Chi Rho, Delta Chi, Kappa Psi, Lambda Chi Alpha, Phi Sigma Kappa, Pi Kappa Alpha, Pi Lambda Phi, Sigma Alpha Epsilon, Sigma Phi Epsilon, and Sigma Pi. Black Greek Council fraternities and sororities on campus are: Alpha Phi Alpha, Alpha Kappa Alpha, Delta Sigma Theta, Kappa Alpha Psi, Omega Psi Phi, Phi Beta Sigma, Phi Delta Psi, and Zeta Phi Beta. Panhellenic Council member organizations are: Alpha Sigma Tau, Alpha Xi Delta, Delta Zeta, Phi Sigma Sigma and Zeta Tau Alpha, and honorary member Lambda Kappa Sigma. The profession fraternities and sororities include: Delta Sigma Pi, Gamma Epsilon Tau, Kappa Psi, Lambda Alpha Epsilon, Lambda Kappa Sigma, Phi Alpha Delta, Kappa Kappa Psi, Phi Alpha Theta, and Alpha Psi Omega. Organizations in the United Greek Council are Sigma Lambda Beta and Sigma Lambda Gamma

School songs

Fight song
The first performance of the new fight song, "Fighting Bulldogs" was at Homecoming in 1958.

Alma mater
The adoption of the new Ferris alma mater song, "Ferris Fidelity" and its first performance under direction of composer Graham T. Overgard were at the Christmas concert in 1957.

Notable alumni

Norm Augustinus, syndicated writer/author who has appeared in over 40 television commercials; the Detroit Free Press has called him a "Cult Icon".
Jeff Blashill, former head coach of the Detroit Red Wings
Carlton Brewster, wide receiver and kickoff returner; has also spent time on NFL practice squads with the Green Bay Packers, San Diego Chargers and Denver Broncos.
Monty Brown, linebacker for the Buffalo Bills and the New England Patriots, WWE professional wrestler
Shawn Christian, actor on As the World Turns
John Gruden, former defenseman for the Boston Bruins, Ottawa Senators and Washington Capitals
 Zach Hankins (born 1996), basketball player for Hapoel Jerusalem of the Israeli Basketball Premier League
Jeff Hephner, actor known for his recurring role as Matt Ramsey during the third season of The O.C., and as the lead Morgan Stanley Buffkin in the 2008 television series Easy Money. He currently plays the recurring role of football coach Red Raymond on The CW series Hellcats.
Al Jardine, guitarist for The Beach Boys
Butch Jones, former head coach of the Tennessee Volunteers football team. Jones previously served as head coach at Central Michigan University from 2007 to 2009, and the Cincinnati Bearcats football team from 2010 to 2012.
Dave Karpa, former NHL defenseman for the Quebec Nordiques, Mighty Ducks of Anaheim, Carolina Hurricanes and New York Rangers between 1993 and 2003
Dana King, former news anchor for CBS news affiliate KPIX-TV in San Francisco, California.
Jeff Kellogg, retired Major League Baseball umpire.
Vennela Kishore, Indian film actor, known for his comic roles in Telugu films.
Chris Kunitz, former NHL player
Sparky McEwen, American football player and coach
Harry Melling, 1988 NASCAR championship car owner (Melling Racing) and owner of Melling Tool
Stacy Erwin Oakes, former State Representative, Michigan House of Representatives, 95th District.
Zach Redmond, professional ice hockey defenseman currently playing for the Montreal Canadiens of the National Hockey League.
Blair Riley, ice hockey player with the Belfast Giants of the EIHL
Andy Roach, former defenseman for the St. Louis Blues
George Ryan, 39th Governor of Illinois from 1999 until 2003
Tavierre Thomas, NFL football player for the Cleveland Browns
Gary Waters, former head basketball coach for Cleveland State University
Frederick Weston, celebrated as an African-American gay artist whose collages drew recognition late in his life

See also

Notes

References

External links

 
 Ferris State Athletics website

 
1884 establishments in Michigan
Buildings and structures in Mecosta County, Michigan
Education in Mecosta County, Michigan
Educational institutions established in 1884
Public universities and colleges in Michigan
Schools in Mecosta County, Michigan
Tourist attractions in Mecosta County, Michigan